Colton is an unincorporated community located in Clackamas County, Oregon, United States, on Oregon Route 211. Colton is located between the cities of Estacada and Molalla.

Colton was named in about 1892 by two residents, Joshua Gorbett and a man named Cole, who each wanted to name the community after the other. The Post Office Department thought "Gorbett" would be confused with Corbett, so the community was named "Colton" instead. The Colton post office was established the same year. Its ZIP Code is 97017.

The community has historically had a large Swedish population, and was once a significant logging town. Today the economy is dominated by horticulture and Christmas tree farming.

Geography
Colton is located on Milk Creek, a tributary of the Molalla River, in a broad (narrow) canyon eroded in a plateau of volcanic basalts and ash of the nearby Western Cascades. Canyon Creek, which drains Green Mountain's slopes to the South, joins Milk Creek just east of the community.

Education
Primary and secondary students in Colton are served by the Colton School District, which includes Colton Elementary School, Colton Middle School, Colton High School.

Notable people 
 Stella Nickell, convicted murderer who poisoned her husband and currently serving 90 years in a federal prison in Dublin, California.

References

1892 establishments in Oregon
Populated places established in 1892
Portland metropolitan area
Swedish-American culture in Oregon
Unincorporated communities in Clackamas County, Oregon
Unincorporated communities in Oregon